Pagodulina is a genus of very small air-breathing land snails, terrestrial pulmonate gastropod mollusks in the family Pagodulinidae.

Species 
Pagodulina austeniana 
Pagodulina bellardii 
Pagodulina elegantissima 
Pagodulina epirotes 
Pagodulina hauseri 
Pagodulina kaeufeli 
Pagodulina klemmi 
Pagodulina lederi 
Pagodulina pagodula  - the type species
Pagodulina pisidica 
Pagodulina sparsa 
Pagodulina subdola 
Pagodulina tschapecki 
Species brought into synonymy
 Pagodulina orientalis Hausdorf, 1996: synonym of Pagodulina subdola orientalis Hausdorf, 2006 (unaccepted rank)

References 

 Gittenberger, E. (1978). Beiträge zur Kenntnis der Pupillacea VIII. Einiges über Orculidae. Zoologische Verhandelingen, 163: 1-44, pl. 1-4. Leiden
 Bank, R. A. (2017). Classification of the Recent terrestrial Gastropoda of the World. Last update: July 16th, 2017

External links 
 AnimalBase info

Pagodulinidae